Christmas Eve with Johnny Mathis is the fourth Christmas album by American pop singer Johnny Mathis that was released on September 23, 1986, by Columbia Records. This was Mathis's fourth holiday-themed LP and focused exclusively on secular material.

The album spent a week on Billboard magazine's Christmas Albums chart in the issue dated December 12, 1992, (no such chart was published in 1986) and two weeks on its Top Pop Catalog Albums chart in December 1994.

The recording of "Jingle Bells" on this release is subtitled "(Let's Take a Sleigh Ride)" on the front and back covers of the album jacket. (The CD booklet does not include song titles on the cover.) The track opens with background vocalists singing, "Let's take a sleigh ride, a merry sleigh ride," and the subtitle is inserted into each refrain of the chorus. Although no credit for additional lyrics is cited, the credit for the arranger of this rendition, Ray Ellis, is listed with the songwriter's name on the LP label.

The album's opener, "It's Beginning to Look a Lot Like Christmas", was featured in the 1992 holiday release Home Alone 2: Lost in New York and included on its original soundtrack album. In the issue of Billboard dated November 28, 2009, the list of the "Top 10 Holiday Songs (Since 2001)" places the Mathis recording at number 10.

Reception

People magazine's reviewer, Ralph Novak, describes Mathis's singing on the album as "characteristically smooth, yet never very engaged", and feels that the arrangements "tend to big stringy orchestrations that are too much for intimacy and not passionate enough for majesty."

Track listing
All tracks recorded in July 1986. Personnel information taken from the liner notes for the original album:

"It's Beginning to Look a Lot Like Christmas" (Meredith Willson) – 2:14
 Jeremy Lubbock – arranger, conductor 
 John Arrias – recording engineer 
 Gerald Vinci – concertmaster 
 Jules Chaikin – contractor 
"Toyland" from Babes in Toyland (Glen MacDonough, Victor Herbert) – 3:41
 Ray Ellis – arranger, conductor 
 John Arrias – recording engineer 
 Gerald Vinci – concertmaster 
 Joe Soldo – contractor 
"It's the Most Wonderful Time of the Year" (Edward Pola, George Wyle) – 2:45
 Jeremy Lubbock – arranger, conductor 
 John Arrias – recording engineer 
 Gerald Vinci – concertmaster 
 Jules Chaikin – contractor 
"Jingle Bells" (James Pierpont) – 2:54
 Ray Ellis – arranger, conductor 
 Daren Klein – recording engineer 
 Erno Neufeld – concertmaster 
 Marion Klein – contractor 
Medley – 5:09  a. "Christmas Is for Everyone" (Richard Loring, Dorothy Wayne)  b. "Where Can I Find Christmas?" from The Bear Who Slept Through Christmas (Doug Goodwin)
 Ray Ellis – arranger, conductor 
 Daren Klein – recording engineer 
 Erno Neufeld – concertmaster 
 Marion Klein – contractor 
 International Children's Choir (Irene Bayless, director) – backing vocals 
 The kids from St. Michael's School, North Hollywood – backing vocals 
Medley from Santa Claus: The Movie – 4:03  a. "Every Christmas Eve" (Leslie Bricusse, Henry Mancini)  b. "Giving (Santa's Theme)" (Bricusse, Mancini)
 Henry Mancini – arranger, conductor 
 Henry Mancini Orchestra & Chorus – performers 
Mick Guzauski – recording engineer 
 Erno Neufeld – concertmaster 
 Marion Klein – contractor 
"The Christmas Waltz" (Sammy Cahn, Jule Styne) – 2:36
 Ray Ellis – arranger, conductor 
 John Arrias – recording engineer 
 Gerald Vinci – concertmaster 
 Joe Soldo – contractor 
"We Need a Little Christmas" from Mame (Jerry Herman) – 1:54
 Ray Ellis – arranger, conductor 
 John Arrias – recording engineer 
 Gerald Vinci – concertmaster 
 Joe Soldo – contractor 
Medley – 3:44  a. "Caroling, Caroling" (Alfred Burt, Wilha Hutson)  b. "Happy Holiday" from Holiday Inn (Irving Berlin)
 Jeremy Lubbock – arranger, conductor 
 John Arrias – recording engineer 
 Gerald Vinci – concertmaster 
 Jules Chaikin – contractor 
"It's Christmas Time Again" (Sonny Burke, John Elliot, James K. Harwood) – 4:28
 Jeremy Lubbock – arranger, conductor 
 John Arrias – recording engineer 
 Gerald Vinci – concertmaster 
 Jules Chaikin – contractor

Song information

"Jingle Bells" is the oldest of the songs that Mathis covers here and was published under the name "The One Horse Open Sleigh" in 1857. "Toyland" originated in the 1903 operetta Babes in Toyland, and "Happy Holiday" was first performed in the 1942 film Holiday Inn. Perry Como and the Fontane Sisters reached number 19 on Billboard magazine's Records Most Played by Disc Jockeys chart and number 23 on its list of the Best-Selling Pop Singles of the week in 1951 with the first recording of "It's Beginning to Look a Lot Like Christmas". Peggy Lee's rendition of "It's Christmas Time Again" was released in 1953, and "Caroling, Caroling" first appeared on the 1954 LP The Christmas Mood by The Columbia Choir.

"The Christmas Waltz" was written for Frank Sinatra and debuted as the flipside to his 1954 cover of "White Christmas". "It's the Most Wonderful Time of the Year" was written for The Andy Williams Show and first appeared on The Andy Williams Christmas Album in 1963. "We Need a Little Christmas" was first performed in the 1966 Broadway musical Mame. "Where Can I Find Christmas?" comes from the 1973 TV special The Bear Who Slept Through Christmas, and the medley of "Every Christmas Eve" and "Giving (Santa's Theme)" was part of the soundtrack of the 1985 film Santa Claus: The Movie.

Personnel
From the liner notes for the original album:

Johnny Mathis – vocals
Denny Diante – producer
Richard Loring – musical consultant
Monica Mancini – vocal contractor
John Arrias – mixing engineer
Chris Bellman – mastering engineer
Jo-Anne McGettrick – production coordinator
Nancy Donald – art direction
Tony Lane – art direction
Peter Greco – lettering
David Vance – photographer
24 Collection – wardrobe

Jeff Bennett (One on One Studios) – assistant engineer
Greg Dennen (One on One Studios) – assistant engineer
Michael Dubois (One on One Studios) – assistant engineer
Daren Klein (Conway Studios) – assistant engineer
Richard McKernan (Conway Studios) – assistant engineer
Joe Schiff (Ocean Way) – assistant engineer
Toby Wright (One on One Studios) – assistant engineer
Jessie Peck – Conway Studios assistant
Joe Gastwirt (Digital Magnetics Studio) – compact disc preparation
Mastered at Bernie Grundman Mastering, Hollywood, California
Mixed at Conway Studios, Hollywood, California

References

Bibliography

Johnny Mathis albums
1986 Christmas albums
Albums arranged by Ray Ellis
Christmas albums by American artists
Columbia Records Christmas albums
Pop Christmas albums
Albums recorded at United Western Recorders